The BELEXline index is the index of the Belgrade Stock Exchange (BELEX).

BELEXline is free‐float market capitalization weighted index, which is not adjusted for paid dividends, and is not protected from dilution effect, which appears as result of dividends payout. BELEXline is weighted only by free‐float market capitalization. BELEXline consists of shares traded on the BELEX markets, which have satisfied criteria
for inclusion in the index basket. Influence of the components in index is limited to maximum 10% of index capitalization.

Composition
List of the BELEXline constituents as of 30 September 2021.
 Belgrade Nikola Tesla Airport
 Messer Tehnogas
 Komercijalna banka
 NIS
 Metalac
 MPP Jedinstvo
 Fintel Energija
 Dunav osiguranje
 Alta banka a.d.
 Lasta
 Energoprojekt holding
 Impol Seval
 Alfa plam
 Kopaonik
 Iritel a.d.
 Informatika a.d.
 Jugoprevoz Kruševac
 Termika-Beograd a.d.
 Novosadski sajam a.d.
 AMS Osiguranje a.d.
 Tehnohemija a.d.
 Vital
 Preduzeće za puteve Valjevo a.d.
 Goša montaža a.d.
 Min Div a.d.
 Goša FOM a.d. Smederevska Palanka
 Voda Vrnjci a.d.
 Žitopek a.d.
 Putevi Užice a.d.
 Termovent SC Livnica čelika a.d.
 VP Dunav a.d.
 Auto kuća 21. maj a.d.
 Tigar
 Autoventil a.d.

References

External links
 BELEXline daily standing

Economy of Serbia
European stock market indices